The 1937 West Virginia Mountaineers football team was an American football team that represented West Virginia University as an independent during the 1937 college football season. In its first season under head coach Marshall Glenn, the team compiled an 8–1–1 record, defeated Texas Tech in the 1938 Sun Bowl, and outscored opponents by a total of 183 to 39. The team played its home games at Mountaineer Field in Morgantown, West Virginia. David Volkin was the team captain.

Schedule

References

West Virginia
West Virginia Mountaineers football seasons
Sun Bowl champion seasons
West Virginia Mountaineers football